In mathematics, the tensor product  of two vector spaces  and  (over the same field) is a vector space to which is associated a bilinear map  that maps a pair  to an element of  denoted 

The tensor product of two vector spaces captures the properties of all bilinear maps in the sense that a bilinear map from  into another vector space  factors uniquely through a linear map  (see Universal property).

Tensor products are used in many application areas, including physics and engineering. For example, in general relativity, the gravitational field is described through the metric tensor, which is a vector field of tensors, one at each point of the space-time manifold, and each belonging to the tensor product with itself of the cotangent space at the point.

Definitions and constructions 

The tensor product of two vector spaces is a vector space that is defined up to an isomorphism. There are several equivalent ways to define it. Most consist of defining explicitly a vector space that is called a tensor product, and, generally, the equivalence proof results almost immediately from the basic properties of the vector spaces that are so defined. 

The tensor product can also be defined through a universal property; see , below. As for every universal property, all objects that satisfy the property are isomorphic through a unique isomorphism that is compatible with the universal property. When this definition is used, the other definitions may be viewed as constructions of objects satisfying the universal property and as proofs that there are objects satisfying the universal property, that is that tensor products exist.

From bases 
Let  and  be two vector spaces over a field , with respective bases  and 

The pointwise operations make  a vector space.

The tensor product of two vectors is defined from their decomposition on the bases. More precisely, if 

Therefore, the tensor product is a generalization of the outer product.

A limitation of this definition of the tensor product is that, if one changes bases, a different tensor product is defined. However, the decomposition on one basis of the elements of the other basis defines a canonical isomorphism between the two tensor products of vector spaces, which allows identifying them. Also, contrarily to the two following alternative definitions, this definition cannot be extended into a definition of the tensor product of modules over a ring.

As a quotient space 
A construction of the tensor product that is basis independent can be obtained in the following way.

Let  and  be two vector spaces over a field . 

One considers first a vector space  that has the Cartesian product  as a basis.

Let  be the linear subspace of  that is spanned by the relations that the tensor product must satisfy. More precisely  is spanned by the elements of one of the forms

where   and 

Then, the tensor product is defined as the quotient space

It is straightforward to prove that the result of this construction satisfies the universal property considered below. (A very similar construction can be used to define the tensor product of modules.)

Universal property

In this section, the universal property satisfied by the tensor product is described. As for every universal property, two objects that satisfy the property are related by a unique isomorphism. It follows that this is a (non-constructive) way to define the tensor product of two vector spaces. In this context, the preceding constructions of tensor products may be viewed as proofs of existence of the tensor product so defined.

A consequence of this approach is that every property of the tensor product can be deduced from the universal property, and that, in practice, one may forget the method that has been used to prove its existence. 

The "universal-property definition" of the tensor product of two vector spaces is the following (recall that a bilinear map is a function that is separately linear in each of its arguments):

Linearly disjoint

Like the universal property above, the following characterization may also be used to determine whether or not a given vector space and given bilinear map form a tensor product.

Let  and  be any sets and for any  and  let  denote the function defined by  

Properties

Dimension 

Associativity 

The tensor product is associative in the sense that, given three vector spaces  there is a canonical isomorphism 

that maps  to 

This allows omitting parentheses in the tensor product of more than two vector spaces or vectors.

Commutativity as vector space operation 

that maps  to 

More generally and as usual (see tensor algebra), let denote  the tensor product of  copies of the vector space . For every permutation  of the first  positive integers, the map

Tensor product of linear maps

Given a linear map  and a vector space , the tensor product 

is the unique linear map such that

The tensor product  is defined similarly.

Given two linear maps  and  their tensor product 
 
is the unique linear map that satisfies 

One has 

In terms of category theory, this means that the tensor product is a bifunctor from the category of vector spaces to itself.

In particular, the tensor product with a vector space is an exact functor; this means that every exact sequence is mapped to an exact sequence (tensor products of modules do not transform injections into injections, but they are right exact functors).

By choosing bases of all vector spaces involved, the linear maps  and  can be represented by matrices. Then, depending on how the tensor  is vectorized, the matrix describing the tensor product  is the Kronecker product of the two matrices.

respectively, then the tensor product of these two matrices is

The resultant rank is at most 4, and thus the resultant dimension is 4. Note that  here denotes the tensor rank i.e. the number of requisite indices (while the matrix rank counts the number of degrees of freedom in the resulting array). Note  

A dyadic product is the special case of the tensor product between two vectors of the same dimension.

General tensors

For non-negative integers  and  a type  tensor on a vector space  is an element of

There is a product map, called the 

In terms of these bases, the components of a (tensor) product of two (or more) tensors can be computed.

Thus, the components of the tensor product of two tensors are the ordinary product of the components of each tensor. Another example: let  be a tensor of type  with components  and let  be a tensor of type  with components  Then

and

Tensors equipped with their product operation form an algebra, called the tensor algebra.

Evaluation map and tensor contraction
For tensors of type  there is a canonical evaluation mapdefined by its action on pure tensors:

This map does not depend on the choice of basis.

The interplay of evaluation and coevaluation can be used to characterize finite-dimensional vector spaces without referring to bases.

Adjoint representation
The tensor product  may be naturally viewed as a module for the Lie algebra  by means of the diagonal action: for simplicity let us assume  then, for each 

There is a canonical isomorphism  given by

 Linear maps as tensors 
There is an isomorphism,

defined by an action of the pure tensor  on an element of 

Its "inverse" can be defined using a basis  and its dual basis  as in the section "Evaluation map and tensor contraction" above:

This result implies

This is an example of adjoint functors: the tensor product is "left adjoint" to Hom.

Tensor products of modules over a ring

More generally, the tensor product can be defined even if the ring is non-commutative.

is imposed. If  is non-commutative, this is no longer an -module, but just an abelian group.

The first two properties make  a bilinear map of the abelian group  For any middle linear map  of  a unique group homomorphism  of  satisfies  and this property determines  within group isomorphism. See the main article for details.

Tensor product of modules over a non-commutative ring

Let A be a right R-module and B be a left R-module. Then the tensor product of A and B is an abelian group defined by

The universal property can be stated as follows. Let G be an abelian group with a map  that is bilinear, in the sense that

Then there is a unique map  such that  for all  and 

Furthermore, we can give  a module structure under some extra conditions:
 If A is a (S,R)-bimodule, then  is a left S-module where 
 If B is a (R,S)-bimodule, then  is a right S-module where 
 If A is a (S,R)-bimodule and B is a (R,T)-bimodule, then  is a (S,T)-bimodule, where the left and right actions are defined in the same way as the previous two examples.
 If R is a commutative ring, then A and B are (R,R)-bimodules where  and  By 3), we can conclude  is a (R,R)-bimodule.

Computing the tensor product
For modules over a general (commutative) ring, not every module is free. For example,  is not a free abelian group (-module).

More generally, given a presentation of some -module , that is, a number of generators  together with relations

the tensor product can be computed as the following cokernel:

Colloquially, this may be rephrased by saying that a presentation of  gives rise to a presentation of  This is referred to by saying that the tensor product is a right exact functor. It is not in general left exact, that is, given an injective map of -modules  the tensor product

is not usually injective. Higher Tor functors measure the defect of the tensor product being not left exact. All higher Tor functors are assembled in the derived tensor product.

Tensor product of algebras

Let  be a commutative ring. In this case, the tensor product  is an -algebra itself by putting

For example,

In the larger field , the polynomial may become reducible, which brings in Galois theory.

is isomorphic (as an -algebra) to the 

Eigenconfigurations of tensors
The fixed points of nonlinear maps are the eigenvectors of tensors. Let  be a -dimensional tensor of format  with entries  lying in an algebraically closed field  of characteristic zero.
 

and the eigenconfiguration is given by the variety of the  minors of this matrix.

Other examples of tensor products

Tensor product of Hilbert spaces

Hilbert spaces generalize finite-dimensional vector spaces to countably-infinite dimensions. The tensor product is still defined; it is the tensor product of Hilbert spaces.

Topological tensor product

When the basis for a vector space is no longer countable, then the appropriate axiomatic formalization for the vector space is that of a topological vector space. The tensor product is still defined, it is the topological tensor product.

Tensor product of graded vector spaces

Some vector spaces can be decomposed into direct sums of subspaces. In such cases, the tensor product of two spaces can be decomposed into sums of products of the subspaces (in analogy to the way that multiplication distributes over addition).

Tensor product of representations

Vector spaces endowed with an additional multiplicative structure are called algebras. The tensor product of such algebras is described by the Littlewood–Richardson rule.

Tensor product of quadratic forms

Tensor product of multilinear forms

This is a special case of the product of tensors if they are seen as multilinear maps (see also tensors as multilinear maps). Thus the components of the tensor product of multilinear forms can be computed by the Kronecker product.

Tensor product of sheaves of modules

Tensor product of line bundles

Tensor product of fields

Tensor product of graphs

It should be mentioned that, though called "tensor product", this is not a tensor product of graphs in the above sense; actually it is the category-theoretic product in the category of graphs and graph homomorphisms. However it is actually the Kronecker tensor product of the adjacency matrices of the graphs. Compare also the section Tensor product of linear maps above.

Monoidal categories

The most general setting for the tensor product is the monoidal category. It captures the algebraic essence of tensoring, without making any specific reference to what is being tensored. Thus, all tensor products can be expressed as an application of the monoidal category to some particular setting, acting on some particular objects.

Quotient algebras
A number of important subspaces of the tensor algebra can be constructed as quotients: these include the exterior algebra, the symmetric algebra, the Clifford algebra, the Weyl algebra, and the universal enveloping algebra in general.

The exterior algebra is constructed from the exterior product. Given a vector space , the exterior product  is defined as

Note that when the underlying field of  does not have characteristic 2, then this definition is equivalent to

The latter notion is the basis of differential -forms.

The symmetric algebra is constructed in a similar manner, from the symmetric product

More generally

That is, in the symmetric algebra two adjacent vectors (and therefore all of them) can be interchanged. The resulting objects are called symmetric tensors.

Tensor product in programming

Array programming languages
Array programming languages may have this pattern built in. For example, in APL the tensor product is expressed as ○.× (for example A ○.× B or A ○.× B ○.× C). In J the tensor product is the dyadic form of */ (for example a */ b or a */ b */ c).

Note that J's treatment also allows the representation of some tensor fields, as a and b may be functions instead of constants. This product of two functions is a derived function, and if a and b are differentiable, then a */ b is differentiable.

However, these kinds of notation are not universally present in array languages. Other array languages may require explicit treatment of indices (for example, MATLAB), and/or may not support higher-order functions such as the Jacobian derivative (for example, Fortran/APL).

See also

Notes

References

  

Operations on vectors
Operations on structures
Bilinear maps